Ib river is tributary of Mahanadi river in North-Eastern Central India. It joins Mahanadi river flowing directly into the Hirakud Reservoir. It passes through Raigarh district and Jashpur district of Chhattisgarh and Jharsuguda and Sundargarh District of Odisha and finally meets Mahanadi at Hirakud Dam in the state .

Ib river valley is famous for its rich coal belt, Ib Valley Coalfield. Major portions of Mahanadi Coalfields are situated on the banks of Ib. Many industries have flourished on the banks of the river Ib. The Ib valley areas are counted as one of the most important industrial zones of Eastern India.

There are enough sightseeing opportunities in the adjoining areas of River Ib. it is believed that the perennial river inspired several tribal groups of Chhattisgarh and Odisha to make a permanent habitat on its bank in the past ages. Also, there are ample folklores regarding the mythological significance of the Ib river.

Watershed Area 

It is covering an around 25000 square kilometers area in Jashpur district and meeting with Mahanadi at Hirakud.

References 

Rivers of Chhattisgarh
Rivers of Jashpur
Tributaries of the Mahanadi River
Rivers of Odisha
Rivers of India